Chingiz Azamatovich Aidarbekov is a Kyrgyz diplomat who is a former Minister of Foreign Affairs of Kyrgyzstan serving in the position from October 2018 to October 2020.
In October 2022, by decree of President Sadyr Zhaparov, Aidarbekov Chingiz was deprived of the diplomatic rank of Ambassador Extraordinary and Plenipotentiary of the Kyrgyz Republic.

Biography
Aidarbekov was born on October 27, 1977 in the city of Frunze (now Bishkek), the capital of the Kyrgyz Soviet Socialist Republic. He began his professional career as the Attaché of the Ministry of Foreign Affairs of the Kyrgyz Republic. He also served until 2005 as the 1st, 2nd and 3rd secretary of the CIS Department of the Ministry of Foreign Affairs. His diplomatic career was launched when he was transferred from Bishkek to the Kyrgyz Embassy in Tashkent, working as Chargé d'Affaires for 3 years. He returned to Bishkek in 2008 to briefly serve as  Head of the Department of Multilateral Cooperation of the Ministry of Foreign Affairs. Later that year, he would leave the country again to become the Counselor at the Embassy of Kyrgyzstan in Ashgabat, Turkmenistan. In January 2011, Aidarbekov was invited to head the protocol department of the President of Kyrgyzstan and 4 months later, was made the deputy head of external relations and protocol. President Almazbek Atambayev appointed Aidarbekov as Ambassador of the Kyrgyz Republic to Japan in April 2016. On October 17, 2018, he was promoted to the position of Minister of Foreign Affairs by President Sooronbay Jeenbekov, replacing Erlan Abdyldayev.

Private life

In his family, he has one sister,  as well as his father Azamat and his mother Zifargul. He is also the grandson of Kyrgyz-Soviet politician and statesman Imanali Aidarbekov. Besides Kyrgyz and Russian, he is also fluent in English.

Education
 (1998) - graduated from the International University of Kyrgyzstan with a degree in international relations.
 (2001) - graduated from the International University of Kyrgyzstan with a degree in international law
 (2017) - completed his post-graduate studies at the Kyrgyz Russian Slavic University named after Boris Yeltsin

See also
Ministry of Foreign Affairs (Kyrgyzstan)

References 

1977 births
Foreign ministers of Kyrgyzstan
Ambassadors of Kyrgyzstan to Japan
Living people
People from Bishkek